Dalia Ziada (in Arabic: داليا زيادة ; born 2 January 1982) is an Egyptian award-winning writer. She is the author of "The Curious Case of the Three-Legged Wolf - Egypt: Military, Islamism, and Liberal Democracy" and other internationally acclaimed non-fiction books on Middle East politics. She currently works as the Chairperson of the Liberal Democracy Institute, and Executive Director of MEEM Center for Middle East and Eastern Mediterranean Studies.

Biography 
Dalia Ziada was born in Cairo, Egypt. Her mother is an Arabic school teacher and her late father was a military engineer of arms and ammunitions at the Egyptian Armed Forces. Ziada studied International Security at the Fletcher School of Law and Diplomacy at Tufts University in the United States.

Dalia Ziada is recognized for playing a central role in the civil society movement that initiated Egypt's 2011 revolution against the Mubarak regime. She was named by CNN as one of eight agents of change in the Middle East, and by The Daily Beast as one of the most fearless women in the world for two years in a row.

Dalia Ziada's story and struggle for liberal democratization in Egypt are profiled in American best-selling books such as Robin Wright's Rock the Casbah: Rage and Rebellion across the Islamic World; and Lily Eskelsen Garcia's Rabble Rousers: Fearless Fighters for Social Justice.

Dalia Ziada worked as the Executive Director of Ibn Khaldun Center for Democratic Studies, and as regional director for The American Islamic Congress. Currently, she leads two think tanks: Liberal Democracy Institute, and MEEM Center for Middle East and Eastern Mediterranean Studies. In addition, she is a board member of the Foreign Affairs Committee at the National Council for Women in Egypt.

Bibliography

Published books

 Author, The Curious Case of the Three-Legged Wolf - Egypt: Military, Islamism, and Liberal Democracy; Liberal Democracy Institute 2019
 Co-author, Paradox of Repression and Nonviolent Movements; Syracuse University Press 2018
 Editor, The Status-quo of Civil Society and Liberal Democratization in the Arab World; Ibn Khaldun Center 2012
 Co-author, A Modern Narrative for Muslim Women in the Middle East; American Islamic Congress 2010
 Author, Lam Alef, a collection of poetry in Arabic; Maktoub Publishing 2009
 Translator, Civil Rights and the Montgomery Story, comic book in Arabic; American Islamic Congress 2008
 Editor, Egypt, Whereto? The Future of Democratic Reform; Tharwa Foundation 2008
 Translator, Implacable Adversaries: Arab Governments and The Internet; Arab Network for Human Rights 2006

Papers and articles

Dalia Ziada regularly contributes pieces of analysis to prominent regional and international publications (in Arabic, English, and Turkish) on issues related to geopolitics and defense policy in the Middle East, the Mediterranean, and Africa.

Since 2006, Ziada has run a bilingual blog commenting on issues related to human rights, civil freedom, civil-military affairs, and international relations. In 2010, the Anna Lindh Euro-Mediterranean Foundation for the Dialogue Between Cultures awarded her its Euro-Mediterranean Journalist Award for her blog.

Awards and honors 

 Received the Distinguished Alumni Award fro The Fletcher School of Law and Diplomacy, Tufts University (2014)
 Selected by The Diplomatic Courier as one of the “99 Foreign Policy Leaders under 33 years old” (2013)
 Named by Newsweek for two years in a row (2011-2012) as one of the world’s “most influential” and most “fearless women,” consecutively
 Named by CNN as one of Arab world’s “eight agents of change” (2012)
 Selected by The Daily Beast as one of the world’s 17 bravest bloggers (2011)
 Received Tufts University’s Presidential Award for Citizenship and Public Service (2011)
 Received Anna Lindh Euro-Mediterranean Journalist Award for her blog (2010)

References 

The Fletcher School at Tufts University alumni
Writers from Cairo
1982 births
Living people
Egyptian bloggers
Egyptian women bloggers
Ain Shams University alumni
Democracy activists from Cairo